Kouka is a village in Kongoussi Department, Bam Province, Burkina Faso. It has a population of 800.

References

Bam Province
Populated places in the Centre-Nord Region